Elabbin is a small town between Merredin
and Mukinbudin in the Wheatbelt region of Western Australia located in the Shire of Nungarin.

It originated as a railway siding on the Dowerin to Merredin railway line when constructed in 1912. A demand for land was created by the growth of farming in the area and the town was gazetted in 1913.

Additional agricultural land was opened to selectors in the district close to town in 1917.

The third CBH class locomotive in service for the CBH Group for grain haulage was named after this locality.

References

Towns in Western Australia
Wheatbelt (Western Australia)